Hoya cutis-porcelana is an endemic species of porcelainflower or wax plant found in Biliran and Samar, Philippines is an Asclepiad species of flowering plant in the dogbane family Apocynaceae described in 2013 by W.Suarez, J.R.Sahagun & Aurigue. Hoya cutis-porcelana belongs to the genus Hoya. There are no subspecies listed.

Etymology
The specific epithet, cutis-porcelana literally translate to porcelain skin, which refers to the porcelain-like appearance of the surface of the flowers.

References

cutis-porcelana
Endemic flora of the Philippines
cutis-porcelana